Provincial road N34 is a Dutch provincial road that links the N36 near Ommen, Overijssel to Rijksweg 28 near De Punt, Drenthe. The entire road is an expressway, of which the part between Coevorden and Emmen-West (the junction with the N391) consists of two lanes in each direction.

Route description
The N34 starts in the north in De Punt where it cuts off from the A28 in the province Drenthe and ends in the south in Ommen where it continues as the R105 in the province of Overijssel. At the White Pole between Ommen and Hardenberg, the N36 crosses the N34. At the grade-separated Interchange Holsloot, the A37 crosses the N34, also the N33 crosses the N34 with roads that are grade-separated. In Drenthe the N34 is also known as the Hunebed Highway, because of the many hunebeds near the N34. They even have signs suggesting an American Interstate. The most important cities alongside the N34 are Ommen, Hardenberg, Coevorden, Emmen, Borger, Gieten, Annen and Zuidlaren.

History and future
The route of the N34 has a steeped history. There has been a road for centuries that connects the same locations as the N34 does. This is mainly because a large part of the road is located on the Hondsrug. This ridge crossed above the swamps that were on either side, and habitation was mainly concentrated on the Hondsrug. In 2010 the N34 was rerouted around Ommen to reduce the traffic load in the city and the hamlet of Hoogengraven; the road used to go through Ommen.

The interchange with the N33 used to be a roundabout, but because this is the provincial road with the most accidents by date and especially that crossing, Rijkswaterstaat  decided to make it a grade-separated interchange; this also resulted in a better flow of traffic. To make space for this interchange, an  oak grove had to be cut down. The trees have been cut by Rijkswaterstaat, despite opposition from residents that went to the Council of State of the Netherlands, but lost the case.

Because the N34 is known as a dangerous road (a dodenweg in Dutch) a lot of changes were made over the last few years. Crossings were adjusted so the N34 has no more same-level-junctions anymore. From Ommen to Coevorden it is prohibited to overtake for 18 kilometer as part to make the road more safe. The N34 used to run to the town center of Ommen, but now ends a couple of kilometres east of the town. The original route was downgraded into a recreational route, and traffic now has to use the new northward extension of the N36 to get around Ommen.

Because the road is an important road between bigger cities/towns in the eastern part of the Netherlands, where Enschede, Hengelo, Almelo, Vriezenveen, Ommen, Hardenberg, Coevorden, Emmen, Borger and Groningen are connected with each other, the both provinces want to double the road on four places to discourage an overtake and ease the traffic. At least the part between Coevorden-Noord and Emmen (where the N34 meets the N381) will be doubled before 2022.

Junction and exit list

References

34
34
34